Antonio Busca (1625–1686) was an Italian painter of the Baroque period, mainly active in Lombardy.

He was born in Milan. He trained with Ercole Procaccini, with whom he worked in Milan and Turin. During 1648–9, under Procaccini, Busca along with Johann Christoph Storer, il Moncalvo, and  Luigi Pellegrini Scaramuccia helped decorate of the Chapel of the Crucifix in the church of San Marco in Milan.

In 1650–51, he traveled to Rome to work with Giovanni Ghisolfi, and collaborated with him at the Sacro Monte of Varese. He was also active in the Sacro Monte di Orta. Being much afflicted with the gout, he appears to have been unable to undertake anything with vigor; he sank into a mannered repetition.

References

 See capella del crocefisso entry.

1625 births
1686 deaths
17th-century Italian painters
Italian male painters
Painters from Milan
Italian Baroque painters